Vontari Gulabi is an Indian Telugu language soap opera premiered on 23 January 2023 airing on GeminiTV and it is available for worldwide streaming on Sun NXT. The show stars Supritha Satyanarayan and Rahul Ravi in lead roles.

Cast
Supritha Satyanarayan as Roja
Rahul Ravi as SS Balu
Pooja Durganna as Nithya
Kalyan as Sarangapaani, Roja's father and Nithya's foster father
Manjula Paritala as Malathi, Nithya's mother
Priyanka as Yamuna, Roja's friend
Sravani as Vyjayanthi, Prem sadan orphanage head
Priya as Sridevi, Roja's mother (deceased)
Chandrasekhar as Sudhakar (deceased)
Bhavana as Roja's Teacher
Bhagath as Naveen
Baby Bhavyasri as Roja at childhood

References

Telugu-language television shows
2023 Indian television series debuts
Gemini TV original programming